Robert Anderson McIntosh (1 August 1892 – 1952) was a Scottish footballer who played for Dundee, Motherwell, Newcastle United and Stockport County, as a right half.

References

Date of birth uncertain
1892 births
1952 deaths
Footballers from Dundee
Association football wing halves
Scottish footballers
Dundee F.C. players
Motherwell F.C. players
Newcastle United F.C. players
Stockport County F.C. players
Scottish Football League players
English Football League players
Scottish Football League representative players
Scottish Junior Football Association players
Scotland junior international footballers